Guerreras y Centauros is a  historical Venezuelan telenovela produced by Quimeravision.

Ana Karina Casanova and Damián Genovese will star as the main protagonists, accompanied by Víctor Cámara. The telenovela will be set in the 19th century against the background of the Battle of Carabobo.

The telenovela was filmed in the Venezuelan state of Aragua.

The filming started in 2013.
Broadcast on February 23, 2015 at 9:00 pm.

Plot
Guerreras y Centauros is the story of love in the midst of the dangers of impending war. Love will develop in two large haciendas La Concepción and La Guerrereña. Remedios, owner of La Concepción, falls in love with Aenaus, a simple worker, as a result their relationship will be challenged by the social norms of society

The story unfolds through the interaction between fictional characters and real historical figures.

Cast
 Ana Karina Casanova as María Marta Guerrero
 Jesús Cervó as Jacinto Farfán
 Laura de Sousa as Remedios Dominguez
 Damián Genovese as Eneas
 Víctor Cámara as General José Antonio Páez
 Rosalinda Serfaty as Doña Pura de Exclusa
 Félix Loreto as Remigio Exclusa
 Sebastian Falco as General Narciso 
 Simón Pestana - Pietro Lebrino
 Adolfo Cubas - Canelón Bocanegras "Abracadabra"
 Henry Soto as Reinaldo Dominguez
 Carolina Muizzi - Aspacia
 Ricardo Bianchi as Drago de la Peña
 Asdrúbal Blanco - Ataulfo Rivero Vélez
 Aisha Stambouli as Barbarita 
 Marisela Buitrago as Muñeca
 Yajaira Orta as Lady Margareth
 Alejandro Corona as Sargento Raulitro
 Janeth Flores as Soledad
 Antonio Cuevas
 Marvin Huise as Jácome

References

2015 telenovelas
Venezuelan telenovelas
2015 Venezuelan television series debuts
2015 Venezuelan television series endings
Spanish-language telenovelas